Amine Harit (born 18 June 1997) is a professional footballer who plays as a midfielder for Ligue 1 club Marseille. Born in France, with Moroccan parents, he plays for the Morocco national team.

Club career

Nantes
Harit made his debut for the Ligue 1 side on 13 August 2016 against Dijon. He played the whole match in a 1–0 away win.

Schalke 04
On 10 July 2017, Schalke 04 announced the signing of Harit on a four-year contract. The transfer fee paid to Nantes was reported as €8 million, which could rise to €10 million with bonuses. He made his debut for the German club on 14 August in a DFB-Pokal against BFC Dynamo. He started the match and came off at halftime of a 2–0 away win.

On 25 November 2017, Harit scored his first ever Bundesliga goal against Ruhr rivals Borussia Dortmund as Schalke overturned a 4–0 deficit to a 4–4 draw in a historic Revierderby match. He was named Bundesliga 'Rookie of the Month' for December 2017, going on to  take the 'Bundesliga Rookie of the Year' award for the 2017–18 season.

On 11 December 2019, Harit extended his contract with Schalke for a further three years, until 2024.

Marseille
On 2 September 2021, it was announced that Harit was loaned out to Ligue 1 club Marseille for the 2021–22 Ligue 1 season. He made his debut for the club in a 2–0 Ligue 1 away win over Monaco, delivering an assist for the second goal. In the following match, against Rennes, Harit came on in the 59th minute and scored 12 minutes later, his first goal with OM. On 20 April 2022, he scored the winning goal in a 3–2 home win over his former club Nantes.

On 1 September 2022, Harit joined Marseille again for a season-long loan, this time with an option to make the move permanent. On 7 November, his transfer to OM was made permanent for a fee in the region of €5 million. After having made his 15th appearance of the season, an obligation-to-buy clause in his contract was triggered.

International career
Harit represented the France national youth teams starting from the France U18s until the France U21s. He is of Moroccan descent, and refused a call up to the Morocco U19s in October 2015. He even went to play for France again. However, on 12 September 2017, Harit decided to switch his allegiance to the Morocco national team.

On 7 October 2017, Harit made his international debut for Morocco in a 2018 FIFA World Cup qualification match against Gabon at the Stade Mohammed V in Casablanca, replacing Nordin Amrabat in the 90th minute of the 3–0 victory.

In May 2018, he was named in Morocco's 23-man squad for the 2018 FIFA World Cup in Russia.

On 10 November 2022, he was named in Morocco's 26-man squad for the 2022 FIFA World Cup in Qatar. On 13 November, he sustained a knee injury which ruled him out of the World Cup.

Career statistics

Club

International

Honours
France U19
UEFA European Under-19 Championship: 2016
Individual
 UEFA European Under-19 Championship Team of the Tournament: 2016
 Bundesliga Rookie of the Year: 2017–18
Mars d'Or (Moroccan Youth Player of the Year): 2018

 Bundesliga Player of the Month: September 2019

References

External links

 
 
 

1997 births
Living people
Sportspeople from Pontoise
Citizens of Morocco through descent
Association football midfielders
Moroccan footballers
Morocco international footballers
French footballers
France youth international footballers
French sportspeople of Moroccan descent
Ligue 1 players
Bundesliga players
Paris Saint-Germain F.C. players
Red Star F.C. players
FC Nantes players
FC Schalke 04 players
Olympique de Marseille players
French expatriate footballers
Expatriate footballers in Germany
French expatriate sportspeople in Germany
2018 FIFA World Cup players
Footballers from Val-d'Oise